Guarantã do Norte is a municipality located in Mato Grosso state, Brazil approximately  from Cuiabá.

Population: 36,130 inhabitants

Total area: 

The municipality borders Pará state. It was granted the status of municipality on 13 May 1986.

References

External links
Map from Brasil Channel

Municipalities in Mato Grosso